Wirey Spindell is a 1999 American comedy film directed by Eric Schaeffer, starring Schaeffer, Eric Mabius, Devin Matthews, Zane Adlum, Callie Thorne, Samantha Buck and John Doman.

Cast
 Schaeffer as Wirey Spindell
 Eric Mabius as Wirey, age 17
 Devin Matthews as Wirey, Junior High
 Zane Adlum as Wirey, age 8
 Callie Thorne as Tabitha
 Samantha Buck as Samantha
 John Doman as Mr. Spindell
 Peggy Gormley as Mrs. Spindell, Mature
 Jennifer Wiltsie as Mrs. Spindell, Young
 Caroline Strong as Judy
 Don Creech as Mean Teacher
 John Deyle as Principal Dickens
 Bryan Callen as Robby
 Mel Rodriguez as Ernesto
 Stefan Niemczyk as Lapper
 Gerry Rosenthal as Mike Johnson
 Bill Weeden as Bill
 Jim Gaffigan as Announcer #2
 Jenna Stern as Roxanne
 Leanne Whitney as Beth
 Greg Haberny as Niles
 Michelle Hurst as Arlene
 David Healy as Yuppie
 Rutanya Alda as Coach's Wife
 Keri Lynn Pratt as First Date
 Irma St. Paule as Angel Lady

Release
The film premiered at the Boston Film Festival on 8 September 1999.

Reception
On review aggregator Rotten Tomatoes, Wirey Spindell holds an approval rating of 24%, based on 17 reviews.

Variety wrote that it is the "mix of sex and Schaeffer’s decidedly quirky view of life that sells the pic", and that the scenes where Mabius portrayes Wirey are "among the best in the film."

Kevin Thomas of the Los Angeles Times wrote that Schaeffer is "discreet and funny" and "inspires his actors to risk everything, as he does on both sides of the camera", with Morgenthau being "as venturesome as Schaeffer himself", and Kravat's score being "equally potent". He concluded that while the film "may be too heady for some tastes", it "can stir you deeply, if you’re open to it."

A. O. Scott of The New York Times called the film "banal, boring and confusing."

Marjorie Baumgarten of The Austin Chronicle wrote that Schaeffer "needs to realize that there are few universals in his stories and way too many specifics, and it takes more than a weird name like Wirey Spindell to make a person really distinctive."

References

External links
 
 

American comedy films
1999 comedy films